Kasindi is a town in north eastern Democratic Republic of Congo.

Location
The coordinates of Kasindi are 0°02'52.0"N, 29°41'11.0"E (Latitude:0.047772; Longitude:29.686401).

Overview
The Mpondwe-Kasindi border crossing is a busy transit point for people and trade merchandise. In 2005, it was the busiest cross border point for informal trade between Uganda and DR Congo, accounting for 25.0 percent of exports and 10.6 percent of imports for Uganda.

In 2012, the Mai Mai rebels attacked the towns of Kasindi and Lubiriha in DR Congo, causing hundreds of refugees to flee into Uganda. In 2023, Islamic State bombed a church, killing 17 people.

References

External links

Great Lakes Project to Help African Traders Get Their Goods and Services to Market

Populated places in North Kivu